Bingham is a market town and civil parish in the Rushcliffe borough of Nottinghamshire, England,  east of Nottingham, 12 miles (18.8 km) south-west of Newark-on-Trent and 15 miles (23.3 km) west of Grantham. The town had a population of 9,131 at the 2011 census (up from 8,655 in 2001, with an estimated 10,197 in 2019).

Geography
Bingham lies near the junction of the A46 (following an old Roman road, the Fosse Way) between Leicester and Newark-on-Trent and the A52 between Nottingham and Grantham. Neighbouring communities are Radcliffe-on-Trent, East Bridgford, Car Colston, Scarrington, Aslockton, Whatton-in-the-Vale, Tithby and Cropwell Butler.

History
The name "Bingham" is likely to come from an Old English personal name, Bynna +  ingahām  (Old English).

The Romans built a fortress at Margidunum (Bingham) and a settlement at the river crossing at Ad Pontem (East Stoke) on the Fosse Way, which ran between Isca (Exeter) and Lindum (Lincoln). The south-east of Nottinghamshire later formed the wapentake of Bingham. Bingham acquired a market charter in 1341.

Population and developments

Historically the population of Bingham was 1,082 in 1801. This increased slowly to 2,054 in 1851, but fell back again and in 1901 was just 1,604. In 1951 it was 1,692, since when Bingham has expanded vastly. Much of the housing is relatively new. Most of the older buildings, including the oldest, St Mary and All Saints Church, are near the centre of the town.

Education
Bingham's four schools are Robert Miles Infant school, Robert Miles Junior School, Carnarvon Primary School and the comprehensive Toot Hill School.

Churches
The Anglican parish Church of St. Mary and All Saints, Bingham, occupies a Grade I listed medieval building restored in 1845–1846 and again in 1912. It has a peal of eight bells and a 19th-century organ. It belongs to the Diocese of Southwell and Nottingham.

A new Bingham Methodist Church and social centre, built by public subscription, opened on 1 April 2016 at Eaton Place, on the site of the earlier church. It belongs to the Grantham and Vale of Belvoir Circuit. Archive documents for Bingham Methodist Circuit date back to 1843.

Economy
Although Bingham is largely a dormitory town for Nottingham, it has several businesses and a busy centre. Its shop vacancy rate of 2 per cent contrasts with an East Midlands average of 16 per cent.* There are 20 takeaways and places to eat, 11 hairdressers/salons, 5 estate agents and 39 other retail outlets.

The open-air food market in the central Market Place takes place every Thursday and a farmers' market there on the third Saturday of the month. Bingham provides shopping, medical and other services to surrounding villages. Planning permission has been gained to build a large supermarket near the town centre, but construction has yet to begin. In March 2015 planning permission was given for two other chain supermarkets.

To the north of the town there is an industrial estate holding about 40 businesses. The largest include GWIBS 24/7, Focus Label Machinery, Trent Designs, XACT Document Solutions, The Workplace Depot and Water at Work, and a business club.

Film and TV locations
Bingham was a location in Midlands film director Shane Meadows' film Twenty Four Seven, which contained scenes shot at Toot Hill top field, the Linear Walk, and Bingham Boxing Club. Bingham has also appeared in two episodes of Auf Wiedersehen, Pet, and in some episodes of Crossroads, Woof! and Boon.

Robot Wars series 3, Jungle Run and scenes from Shane Meadows' 2006 film This is England were filmed nearby on the former RAF Newton site. Dickinson's Real Deal was filmed at the Bingham Leisure Centre in 2015 and broadcast on TV on ITV1 in March 2016. 
Four in a Bed, Series 11 Episode 18, was filmed at Bingham Townhouse Hotel in May 2016 and first aired in the late autumn of 2016.

Notable people
In birth order:

Robert Lowe, 1st. Viscount Sherbrooke (1811–1892), statesman born in Bingham into the family of the local rector.
Frank Miles (1852–1891), artist of pastel portraits of society ladies, an architect and a keen plantsman.
Harry Churchill Beet (1873–1946), awarded a Victoria Cross for valour at Wakkerstroom, South Africa, in the Second Boer War on 22 April 1900, born at Brackendale Farm near Bingham.
Mary Joynson (1924–2013), director of Barnardo's from 1973 to 1984, born in Bingham.
Spencer Cozens (born 1965), a Bingham-born musician, writer and producer.

Sport 
Thomas Foster (fl. 1820s), first-class cricketer with Nottingham Cricket Club (1827–28), reportedly born in Bingham.
Thomas Brown (1848–1919), first-class cricketer (Nottinghamshire), born in Bingham.
Philip Miles (1848–1933), first-class cricketer (Nottinghamshire), born in Bingham.
John Brown (born 1862), first-class cricketer (Nottinghamshire) born in Bingham.
Albert Widdowson (1864–1938), first-class cricketer (Derbyshire), born in Bingham.
Stafford Castledine (1912–1986), first-class cricketer (Nottinghamshire), born in Bingham.
Jonathan Stenner (born 1966), cricketer and gastroenterologist, born in Bingham.
Joe Heyes (born 1999), from Bingham, a professional rugby union player for Leicester Tigers.

Leisure and sports

Of the six pubs in the town, four remain as such: the Butter Cross (Wetherspoons, formerly The Crown), the Horse and Plough (Castle Rock Brewery), the White Lion and the Wheatsheaf. 

Bingham Leisure Centre has sports facilities and a swimming pool. These are attached to Toot Hill School.

Bingham has Scout troops with about 140 young members: 1st Bingham Scouts includes Beavers and Cubs.

The town's sports clubs are:
British Canoe Union
Bingham Town Youth Football Club
Bingham Cricket Club
Bingham Rugby Club
Bingham Badminton Club
Bingham Lawn Tennis Club
Bingham Leisure Centre Archery Club
Bingham Sub-Aqua Club
Bingham Penguins – Swimming Club
Vale of Belvoir Cycling Club
Vale Judo Club

Twin town
 Wallenfels in Bavaria, Germany. Music groups have visited to and from the twin towns, and a beer festival is held in Bingham every year.

Transport

Trentbarton provides a frequent public bus service into Nottingham.
Bingham's main railway station provides an hourly service to and beyond Nottingham and Grantham and to Skegness along the Poacher Line. Another station south of Bingham named Bingham Road was opened on the Nottingham-Leicester-Northampton Line. It closed in 1951 to passengers and 1964 to freight. The station site has been demolished and the trackbed is now used as a greenway.

Bus services
Vectare: 833 Bingham Circular via Cropwell Bishop, Langar, Orston and Aslockton
Centrebus:
X6: Bingham–Grantham Trentbarton:
Rushcliffe Mainline: Bingham–Radcliffe–West Bridgford–Nottingham (fastest Bingham–Nottingham route)
Rushcliffe Villager 1: Bingham–East Bridgford–Radcliffe–West Bridgford–Nottingham.

The A46, to the west of the town, was upgraded and completed in 2013 as a grade-separated dual carriageway. The Widmerpool-Newark Improvement has been diverted to the west of the former Roman town to preserve archaeological remains. The A52 bypass to the south of the town opened in December 1986.

See also
Listed buildings in Bingham, Nottinghamshire

Signpost gallery

References

External links
Detailed history of Bingham
Bingham Town Council
This is Bingham
Bingham at the Nottinghamshire Heritage Gateway

 
Towns in Nottinghamshire
Market towns in Nottinghamshire
Civil parishes in Nottinghamshire
Rushcliffe